Hamon Sutton (ca. 1392 – 1461/1462), of Lincoln, was an English politician.

Family
Sutton was the son of MP Robert Sutton of Lincoln. He married Margaret Vavasour, from Yorkshire, who was a member of the influential Skipwith family through her mother.

Career
He was a Member (MP) of the Parliament of England for Lincoln in March 1416 and 1420, May 1421, 1422, 1423, 1425 and 1426, and for Lincolnshire in 1431, 1435 and 1439.

He was High Sheriff of Lincolnshire for 1429–30.

References

1392 births
1460s deaths
English MPs March 1416
Members of the Parliament of England (pre-1707) for Lincoln
High Sheriffs of Lincolnshire
English MPs 1420
English MPs May 1421
English MPs 1422
English MPs 1423
English MPs 1425
English MPs 1426
English MPs 1431
English MPs 1435
English MPs 1439